Valerian Kalinka (or Walerian Kalinka; 1826–1886) was a Polish priest and historian.

Kalinka was born near Cracow, but fled from Poland in 1846 on account of political entanglements and his involvement in the Krakow Uprising.  Kalinka was the founder of the Polish branch of the Resurrectionist Order.  He worked on the "Czas" newspaper in 1848, but finally took refuge in Paris, where his first work was written -- Galicia und Cracoio, an historical and social picture of the country from 1772 to 1850. He afterwards thought of writing a history of Polish emigration, but eventually chose to edit a weekly periodical entitled "Political Polish News", the principal contributors to which were himself and Julian Klaczko. Though forbidden everywhere but in Posen, it existed for four years, and dealt with every aspect of Polish national life. Kalinka's articles show an acquaintance with law, administration, history, and statistics, and had mostly to do with the inner life of Poland. He became an activist in the Hôtel Lambert group.

After 1863, when searching for documents for a life of Prince Adam Czartoryski, he stumbled on important papers which he published in two volumes as The Last Years of Stanislaus Augustus (1787–95). This work placed him at once in the first rank of Polish writers. Poland had not yet had such an historian, especially in the province of diplomacy and foreign politics. Józef Szujski, though unknown to Kalinka, was at the same time working in the same direction. Both were accused of undermining patriotic self-respect, of lowering Poland in foreign eyes, and of destroying veneration for the past. In the preface to this work, Kalinka had already answered these charges. A Pole, he said, is not less a Pole when he learns from past errors how to serve his country better.

About this time Kalinka entered the novitiate of the Resurrection Fathers in Rome, where, save for a few visits to Galicia, he subsequently resided until in 1877, after a visit to the Catholic missions in Bulgaria, he became chaplain of a convent in Jarosław. Here in 1880 appeared the first volume of his Sejmczteroletni (The Four Years Diet).  To the criticism it received, Kalinka replied: "History calls first for truth; nor can truth harm patriotism." The second volume, appeared in 1886, the end of the thirty years he spent writing.  He died in Jarosław.

Works
 Galicja i Kraków pod panowaniem austriackim, 1853
 Przegrana Francji i przyszłość Europy
 Hugo Kołłątaj
 Nasze zadania i uchybienia 
 Ostatnie lata panowania Stanisława Augusta 
 O Dziejach Polski prof. M.Bobrzyńskiego 
 O znaczeniu obchodu 3 Maja
 Przegrana Francji i przyszłość Europy
 Względy Polskie w sprawie władzy świeckiej papieża 
 Żale Polaków na Zachód

References

Attribution

External links
 Biography

1826 births
1886 deaths
19th-century Polish historians
Polish male non-fiction writers
Polish journalists
19th-century Polish Roman Catholic priests
Resurrectionist Congregation
19th-century journalists
Male journalists
19th-century male writers